There is an overlap between Sports such as Boxing, Wrestling, Football, etc. and Mixed martial arts fighters with professional records.

Baseball 
 Jose Canseco

Boxing 
 Muhammad Ali
 Marcus Davis
 Eric Esch
 Don Frye
 Holly Holm
 Ray Mercer
 Mia St. John
 James Toney
 Erin Toughill

Football 
 Marvin Eastman
 Marcus Jones
 Matt Mitrione
 Johnnie Morton
 Bob Sapp
 Brendan Schaub
 Wes Shivers
 Kimbo Slice
 Herschel Walker
 Michael Westbrook

Hockey 
 Donald Brashear

Skateboarding
 Jason Ellis

Wrestling 
 Dave Batista
 Bam Bam Bigelow
 Dos Caras, Jr.
 Kazuyuki Fujita
 Tony Halme
 Antonio Inoki
 Nathan Jones
 Bobby Lashley
 Brock Lesnar
 Shinsuke Nakamura
 Sean O'Haire
 Daniel Puder
 Kazushi Sakuraba
 Dan Severn
 Ken Shamrock
 Paulo César da Silva
 Sylvester Terkay
 Ron Waterman

See also
List of mixed martial artists with professional boxing records
List of prizefighters with professional boxing and kickboxing records

References

Martial arts records
Lists of mixed martial artists